The Firebird Choice Zip Bi is a German two-place, paraglider that was designed and produced by Firebird Sky Sports AG of Füssen. It is now out of production.

Design and development
The Choice Zip Bi was designed as a tandem glider for flight training and as such the Bi designation indicates "bi-place" or two seater.

The "Zip" name indicates that a zipper is included in the wing to reduce wing area when required.

The glider is DHV 1-2 Biplace certified.

Specifications (Choice Zip Bi)

References

Choice Zip Bi
Paragliders